A gallon is unit of measurement for volume

Gallon may refer to:

Gallon (Scots), unit of measurement
Wine gallon, unit of measurement
Gallon (surname)
Gallon, aka Jon Talbain, a fictional character from the video game series Darkstalkers